Alcohol is a liquid form substance which contains ethyl alcohol (also known formally as ethanol) that can cause harm and even damage to a persons DNA. "Alcohol consumption is recognized worldwide as a leading risk factor for disease, disability, and death" and is rated as the most used substance by adolescences. Adolescence is a transitional stage of physical and psychological changes, usually a time in a person life in which they go through puberty. Combining these transitional stages and the intake of alcohol can leave a number of consequences for an adolescent.

Consequences of alcohol use disorder throughout adolescence  

Most research is based on alcohol and the effects on people in general, essentially relating to adults. Little to no research is shown on the intake of alcohol throughout adolescents and the consequences that binge drinking from a young age can create. "The rate of alcohol use increases sharply between the ages of 12 and 21 years, and adolescents frequently adopt a binge-like drinking pattern". These patterns can then lead to various consequences including automobile accidents, substance use disorders, sexual activity, skipping school and failing grades. "Recent studies show that alcohol
consumption has the potential to trigger long-term biological changes that may have detrimental effects on the developing adolescent brain, including neurocognitive impairment." 

Underage drinking causes 5,000 deaths a year. 1,900 by motor vehicle, 1,600 involving homicides, 300 suicides.

Underaged drinking can cause higher risks for depression, anxiety, and low self-esteem. If you're going through puberty, it can also cause changes in your hormones. It can also disrupt growth and puberty. And if you drink too much you can die from injury or alcohol poisoning. It also kills brain cells over time, which can cause behavioral changes, sleep deprivation, permanent damage to memory, and could eventually start to affect your grades.  It can also lead to sexual behavior, and could also lead to sexually transmitted infections, unwanted pregnancy, and sexual assault or rape. It can also lead to these things: car accidents, falls or drowning, suicide, violence and homicide, being a victim of a violent crime, and many more accidents, that affect underage drinkers. And if a child drinks, they have a better chance of being an alcoholic when they are older. That means they might get drunk, be involved in drunken accidents, get into trouble with the law, their family, their friends, schools, and their love interest.

Reason for occurrence 
Marquis states how "Adolescent alcohol use is not an acceptable rite of passage but a serious threat to adolescent development and health, as the statistics related to adolescent impairment, injury, and death attest." Research shows how an adolescent makes the decision to consume alcohol because they are influenced by various factors. "These factors include normal maturational changes that all adolescents experience; genetic, psychological and social factors specific to each adolescent and the various social and cultural environments that surround adolescent, including their families, schools and communities". It is also shown that early onset of alcohol intake can lead to high levels of alcohol use in adulthood.  Alcoholism throughout adolescents is increasing yearly for a number of different reasons. These reasons include: 
 Availability of alcohol 
 Peer pressure 
 Role model 
 Television 
 Anxiety or stress

Prevention 
There are a number of ways to preventing alcohol use disorder throughout adolescents. One of the main ways to do this is to "Promote an understanding of underage alcohol consumption in the context of human development and maturation that takes into account individual adolescent characteristics as well as environmental, ethic, cultural and gender differences". Another way in preventing underage drinking would be by reducing the cultural forces which are encouraging and supporting underage drinking will also contribute to preventing adolescents from consuming alcohol as a culture in which adolescents feel that it is acceptable, will allow them to think that it is appropriate. Another important component to preventing alcohol use disorder throughout adolescence is the responsibility of the government,  to send a message to underage drinkers informing them how themselves and the rest of society strongly disapprove underage alcohol use because of the severe consequences it can cause and also informing that it will not be tolerated.

Legal drinking age 

A legal drinking age for the buying or consuming of alcohol is in place in many of the world's countries, typically with the intent to protect the young from alcohol-related harm. This age varies between countries; for example, the legal drinking age for Australia is 18, whereas the legal drinking age in the United States is 21.

See also 
 Adolescence
 Short-term effects of alcohol consumption
 Long-term effects of alcohol consumption

References 

Alcohol
Alcohol law
Substance-related disorders
Alcohol abuse